Trunk 28 is part of the Canadian province of Nova Scotia's system of trunk highways.

From near downtown Sydney, Trunk 28 takes Victoria Road northward through the Whitney Pier neighbourhood, continuing along Sydney Harbour through South Bar and New Victoria to New Waterford. Trunk 28 turns south towards Lingan Bay, then east through Dominion entering Glace Bay in the Bridgeport area and following Main Street and terminating downtown at the intersection with Commercial Street.

References

028
Roads in the Cape Breton Regional Municipality